P120 may refer to:
 P120 (protein), a cell adhesion protein
 P120 (rocket stage)
 Boulton Paul P.120, a British research aircraft
 
 P-120 Malakhit, a Russian anti-ship missile
 Papyrus 120, a biblical manuscript
 Yamaha P-120, a portable electronic piano
 P120, a state regional road in Latvia